Allon Aslanovich Butayev (born 7 September 1996) is a Russian football player who plays for FC Alania Vladikavkaz.

Club career
He made his debut in the Russian Football National League for FC Alania Vladikavkaz on 1 August 2020 in a game against FC SKA-Khabarovsk, as a starter.

References

External links
 
 Profile by Russian Football National League
 

1996 births
Sportspeople from Vladikavkaz
Living people
Russian footballers
Association football defenders
FC Spartak Vladikavkaz players
Russian First League players
Russian Second League players